Bramble Rose is the debut album by alternative country artist Tift Merritt.  It was released on Lost Highway Records in 2002.

Track listing
All songs written by Tift Merritt.

Reception

All Music's Mark Deming rated it 4.5 out of 5 saying "Bramble Rose is a bit short of perfect, it leaves no doubt that Merritt is already a talent of the first order."

Chart performance

Personnel
 Tift Merritt - Vocals, Rhythm guitar, Piano
 Greg Reading - Pedal steel guitar, Dobro, Harmony vocal, Wurlitzer
 Jay Brown - Bass, Harmony vocal
 Zeke Hutchins - Drums
 Ethan Johns - Lead guitar, Recording engineer, Percussion, Piano, Mixing, Ukulele, Chamberlin, Hammond B-3, Mandolin
 Benmont Tench - Piano, Celeste, Hammond C-3, Harmonium
 CeCe White, Julianna Raye - Harmony vocal
Technical
 Stephen Rhodes - Recording engineer
 Doug Sax - Mastering
 Tony Baker - Photography
 Karen Naff - Art direction and design

Other versions
Don Henley released a cover version featuring Mick Jagger and Miranda Lambert on September 25, 2015 on his album Cass County

References 

Tift Merritt albums
2002 debut albums
Albums produced by Ethan Johns
Lost Highway Records albums